Cupaniopsis newmanii is a rainforest plant in the soapberry family. It is native to eastern Australia. The common name is long-leaved tuckeroo. A rare plant, with a ROTAP listing of 2RC-. The habitat sub tropical rainforest ranging from Mullumbimby in New South Wales to Gympie in south-eastern Queensland.

Description 
A shrub or small tree to 6 metres tall with a stem diameter of 5 cm. An attractive plant with pinkish red new growth in springtime and colourful fruit in the autumn.

The trunk is crooked, and not buttressed. With dark grey or black bark, marked with vertical lines and cracks. Small branches are relatively thick, shoots and branchlets show rusty brown hairs.

Leaves 
Compound leaves are 35 to 45 cm long with 16 to 24 leaflets. Oblong-elliptic or reverse lanceolate in shape.  Leaflets 6 to 13 cm long, 2.5 to 5 cm wide,  sub opposite or alternate on the stem. Leaflets sharply and prominently toothed. Leaflets asymmetrical at the base. Dark green above, paler underneath. The main leaf stem is 8 to 16 cm long. The leaflet stem 1 to 3 cm long. Smooth but channelled on the upper side.

The leaflet has around 15 pairs of lateral veins, ending in a leaf tooth. Leaf venation is more easily seen under the leaf. The midrib is sunken above the leaf, but raised under the leaf.

Flowers, fruit & regeneration 
Pink flowers form on panicles from the leaf axils from July to October. The fruit is an orange red capsule with three lobes, around 2 cm in diameter. Inside the capsule is yellow aril surrounding one to three shiny black seeds, 15 to 20 mm long. Fruit matures from October  to November. Regeneration from fresh seed is unusually fast, with most seeds germinating after a week or two.

References

newmanii
Sapindales of Australia
Trees of Australia
Flora of New South Wales
Flora of Queensland
Ornamental trees
Taxa named by Sally T. Reynolds